is a former Japanese football player.

Playing career
Fujisaki was born in Kagoshima Prefecture on May 16, 1975. After graduating from National Institute of Fitness and Sports in Kanoya, he joined the J1 League club Avispa Fukuoka in 1998. He played many matches as center back from 1999. However his opportunity to play decreased from 2001 and the club was relegated to the J2 League in 2002. He retired at the end of the 2002 season.

Club statistics

References

External links

1975 births
Living people
National Institute of Fitness and Sports in Kanoya alumni
Association football people from Kagoshima Prefecture
Japanese footballers
J1 League players
J2 League players
Avispa Fukuoka players
Association football defenders